Principle Hope is the name of a route through the 130 foot high vertical rock face of the "Bürs plate cliff" (in German:"Bürser Platte") overlooking the village of Bürs in Vorarlberg, Austria.

In September 2009, the face was climbed for the first time by a free climber, Beat Kammerlander. On completing the climb, Kammerlander said, "The Burs Face has always fascinated me. The climb is very particular and uses tiny edges and footholds. If you try it too often you bloody your fingers and wear through the rubber on your shoes. It's a hell of a battle."

References
Daily Telegraph - 30 September 2009 p16
Bergleben 13. March 2009

Climbing routes